Chochenyo may refer to:
 Chochenyo people, an indigenous people of California
 Chochenyo language, their language

Language and nationality disambiguation pages